Hensbarrow Beacon is a hill in Cornwall, England, United Kingdom. It is the highest natural point of the Hensbarrow uplands, a natural region and national character area.

The natural summit of Hensbarrow Beacon is 312m high and is marked by a trig point. The trig point sits atop a 5.4m tall round cairn that was later used as a beacon, it is a scheduled monument. It can be reached by a short walk from the road to the west. However, the summit is overtopped by several large spoil heaps from the nearby china clay workings, the highest of which rises to 355 m, therefore creating an 'artificial' summit 43 metres higher than the natural one.

Geographically, the hill is also the highest point of the St Austell Downs, a large region of downland to the north-west of St Austell. The large degree of separation between it and Bodmin Moor to the north-east gives it enough relative height to make it a natural Marilyn, although the official Marilyn has been moved to the top of the highest spoil tip. (its parent is Brown Willy).

The medieval Blackmoor Stannary was centred at Hensbarrow Beacon, with its records stored at the church in Luxulyan.

Geodesy
Hensbarrow Beacon was the origin (meridian) of the 6 inch and 1:2500 Ordnance Survey maps of Cornwall.

References

Hills of Cornwall
Marilyns of Cornwall
Scheduled monuments in Cornwall